Visitors to Costa Rica require a visa unless they are citizens of one of the eligible countries who are visa exempt up to 90 days. Costa Rican visas are documents issued by the Dirección General de Migración y Extranjería, dependent on the Ministry of Foreign Affairs of Costa Rica, with the stated goal of regulating and facilitating migratory flows. Visitors must hold passports that are valid for at least 6 months from the date of arrival.

Visa policy map

Visa exemption 
Holders of passports of the following 96 jurisdictions do not require a visa to visit Costa Rica:

1 — Passport must be valid for at least one day on arrival.
2 — Passport must be valid for at least three months on arrival.
3 — Including overseas territories of Australia, Denmark, France, Netherlands, New Zealand, Norway, United Kingdom, United States.
4 - Extendable up to 90 days.

Nationals of  holding passports for public affairs do not require a visa for a maximum stay of 30 days.

Visa is not required for holders of diplomatic or service/official passports of China, Colombia, Cuba, Dominican Republic, Ecuador, Indonesia, Morocco, Thailand and Vietnam.

Substitute visas
Nationals who would normally require visas may enter Costa Rica for a maximum of 30 days if they are holding a valid, multiple-entry visa or residence permit issued by the following countries. When utilizing a residence permit, it must be valid for more than six months on arrival.

1 - for holders of residence permits only.
2 - Green Cards or U.S. visas must be valid for more than six months on arrival except for holders of B or D visas. Not applicable to holders of C1 visas.

Further Authorization Required

Holders of passports of the following jurisdictions must have their visa approved by the Commission for Restricted Visas before arrival:

Costa Rica also requires citizens of Cuba and Nicaragua to apply for transit visas before transiting through the country.

Visitor statistics
Most visitors arriving to Costa Rica were from the following countries of nationality:

See also

Visa requirements for Costa Rican citizens

References

Costa Rica